The Putnam County Courthouse, located at 120 N. 4th Street in Hennepin, is Putnam County, Illinois' county courthouse. Built in 1839, the building is the oldest courthouse in the state which is still in use. The courthouse was designed in the Greek Revival style and features four Doric columns at its front entrance. J.A. Williams later (1893) constructed an addition, which included a vault and document room, on the north side of the courthouse.

The courthouse was added to the National Register of Historic Places on March 4, 1975.

References

Courthouses on the National Register of Historic Places in Illinois
Greek Revival architecture in Illinois
Government buildings completed in 1839
Buildings and structures in Putnam County, Illinois
County courthouses in Illinois
National Register of Historic Places in Putnam County, Illinois